Glamorgan County Cricket Club is one of eighteen first-class county clubs within the domestic cricket structure of England and Wales. It represents the historic county of Glamorgan. Founded in 1888, Glamorgan held minor status at first and was a prominent member of the early Minor Counties Championship before the First World War. In 1921, the club joined the County Championship and the team was elevated to first-class status, subsequently playing in every top-level domestic cricket competition in England and Wales.

Glamorgan is the only Welsh first-class cricket club. They have won the English County Championship competition in 1948, 1969 and 1997. Glamorgan have also beaten international teams from all of the Test playing nations, including Australia whom they defeated in successive tours in 1964 and 1968. The club's limited overs team is called simply Glamorgan. Kit colours are blue and yellow for limited overs matches.

The club is based in Cardiff and plays most of its home games at Sophia Gardens, which is located on the bank of the River Taff. Matches have also occasionally been played at Swansea, Colwyn Bay and Cresselly (despite the latter towns being in Denbighshire and Pembrokeshire respectively).

Honours

First XI honours
 County Championship (3) – 1948, 1969, 1997

 Sunday/National League/One Day Cup (4) – 1993, 2002, 2004, 2021
 Minor Counties Championship (0)
 Shared (1): 1900

Second XI honours
 Second XI Championship (2) – 1965, 1980
 Second XI Twenty20 (2) – 2019, 2022

Earliest cricket
Cricket probably reached Wales and Glamorgan by the end of the 17th century. The earliest known reference to cricket in Glamorgan is a match at Swansea in 1780.

Origin of club
The formation of Glamorgan CCC took place on 6 July 1888 at a meeting in the Angel Hotel, Cardiff.

The club competed in the Minor Counties Championship for many years and then applied for first-class status after the First World War.

Glamorgan CCC played its initial first-class match versus Sussex CCC at Cardiff Arms Park on 18–20 May 1921 and thus increased the County Championship to 17 teams. Captained by N.V.H. Riches, Glamorgan won this first match by 23 runs. Only one more victory was achieved that summer; Glamorgan lost 14 games and finished with the wooden spoon.

Club history
Glamorgan won the county championship in 1948 under the captaincy of Wilf Wooller, whose advocacy of high fielding standards was the key to beating stronger batting and bowling teams.

Glamorgan was the unintentional venue for a piece of cricket history on 31 August 1968 when, during Glamorgan v Notts at Swansea, Gary Sobers hit all six balls in an over from Malcolm Nash for six.

Glamorgan won the championship again under Tony Lewis in 1969 and Matthew Maynard in 1997. Lewis is the only Glamorgan player to captain England in Tests, when he became the first Glamorgan cricketer to lead an England tour abroad to play series against India and Pakistan in 1972–73. Maynard, who retired at the end of the 2005 season, was one of the most successful batsmen in first class cricket over the previous 20 years. The 2005 captain, off spinner Robert Croft, proved effective on England tours, and was a useful pinch hitter in List A one-day games.

The club had plans in April 2006 to extend its grounds in the Grade 2 Listed Heritage Park that is Sophia Gardens, with a 17,500 seat super-stadium.

Sophia Gardens became a Test cricket venue in 2009 when the First Test in the Ashes series against Australia was held there.

Players

Current squad
 No. denotes the player's squad number, as worn on the back of their shirt.
  denotes players with international caps.
  denotes a player who has been awarded a county cap.

Records

Most first-class runs for Glamorgan
Qualification – 16,000 runs

Most first-class wickets for Glamorgan
Qualification – 800 wickets

Team totals
Highest total for: 795/5d v. Leicestershire, Leicester, 2022
Highest total against: 750 by Northamptonshire, Cardiff, 2019
Lowest total for: 22 v. Lancashire, Liverpool, 1924
Lowest total against: 33 by Leicestershire, Ebbw Vale, 1965

Batting
Highest score: 410* Sam Northeast, Leicester, 2022

Best partnership for each wicket

Bowling
Best bowling: 10/51 J. Mercer v. Worcestershire, Worcester, 1936
Best match bowling: 17/212 J. C. Clay v. Worcestershire, Swansea, 1937

Lists of players and club captains
 List of Glamorgan CCC players
 List of Glamorgan cricket captains

References

Further reading
H S Altham, A History of Cricket, Volume 1 (to 1914), George Allen & Unwin, 1962
Derek Birley, A Social History of English Cricket, Aurum, 1999
Rowland Bowen, Cricket: A History of its Growth and Development, Eyre & Spottiswoode, 1970
Roy Webber, The Playfair Book of Cricket Records, Playfair Books, 1951
Playfair Cricket Annual – various editions
Wisden Cricketers' Almanack – various editions

External links

 
Cricket clubs established in 1888
Cricket in Glamorgan
Sport in Cardiff
Welsh first-class cricket teams
Organisations based in Cardiff
1888 establishments in Wales